Philipp Strauch (8 August 1862 – 3 November 1924) was a sailor from the Russian Empire, who represented his native country at the 1912 Summer Olympics in Nynäshamn, Sweden. Strauch took the bronze in the 10 Metre.

References

Sources
 
 

1862 births
1924 deaths
Male sailors (sport) from the Russian Empire
Sailors at the 1912 Summer Olympics – 10 Metre
Olympic competitors for the Russian Empire